"Honestly" is a song by German recording artist Daniel Schuhmacher. It was written by Alex Christensen and Peter Könemann for his second studio album, Nothing to Lose (2010), while production on the track was helmed by the former. Released as the album's lead single, it reached number 22 on the German Singles Chart.

Formats and track listings

Charts

Weekly charts

References

External links
 

2009 singles
2009 songs
Daniel Schuhmacher songs
Songs written by Alex Christensen